Kiełpiny may refer to the following places:
Kiełpiny, Golub-Dobrzyń County in Kuyavian-Pomeranian Voivodeship (north-central Poland)
Kiełpiny, Toruń County in Kuyavian-Pomeranian Voivodeship (north-central Poland)
Kiełpiny, Rypin County in Kuyavian-Pomeranian Voivodeship (north-central Poland)
Kiełpiny, Greater Poland Voivodeship (west-central Poland)
Kiełpiny, Warmian-Masurian Voivodeship (north Poland)